A keris bahari is a long version of a keris dagger mainly used in Sumatra. It is also called keris panjang. Keris bahari is dubbed by European people as "Sumatran rapier kris" or "execution keris".

History 
Keris bahari evolved from the original keris, which is a dagger. As men fought, they needed a weapon with greater reach, and keris became longer and heavier. Two forms then evolved: The first is rapier keris (keris bahari), and the second is broadsword keris (sundang). Because the blade became longer, the handle had to be straightened to balance it.

Description 
The hilt of keris bahari is made of horn, sometimes of silver and fish ivory, usually beautifully carved. The shape of the hilt is straight or slightly curving at the end. The sheath tip is usually rounded, but if cased in silver it often has square tip. The blade of keris bahari is long and narrow. Keris bahari is classified to 3 type depending on the length: The longest is called keris panjang, the medium keris alang, and the shortest, keris pendek.

Execution by keris 
The execution by keris is called hukuman salang. Salang is synonymous with keris panjang. The executioner made the victim to squat then drove the keris panjang from certain spot inside his collar bone down to the heart.

See also 

 Kalis
 Langgai Tinggang
 Luwuk (sword)

References

Further reading 

 Gardner, G. B. (1936). Keris and Other Malay Weapons. Singapore: Progressive Publishing Company.

Southeast Asian swords
Malayan swords
Blade weapons
Weapons of Indonesia
Weapons of Malaysia